Joanne Amy Jackson (born 12 September 1986) is an English freestyle swimmer. She is the sister of retired Olympic swimmer Nicola Jackson. She was born in Northallerton and went to Richmond School, North Yorkshire.

Swimming career

2004
She swam in the 2004 Athens Olympics in the 400 m freestyle and 4×200 m freestyle relay. She became the British and European 400 m freestyle champion. She was partly funded by Richmondshire District Council, swimming for Derwentside ASC in Consett, and has swum for Richmond Dales ASC and Durham Aquatics. She first competed in the World Swimming Championships in Barcelona in 2003.

2006
In the 2006 Commonwealth Games she won a silver medal in the 400 m freestyle event.

2008
On 11 August 2008 she won an Olympic bronze medal in 400 m freestyle.

2009
On 16 March 2009 she set a new world record in the 400 m freestyle (long course) in a time of 4:00.66, beating her British rival and reigning Olympic gold medallist Rebecca Adlington in the process, who also broke the previous world record with a time of 4:00.89.

On 26 July, she claimed silver in the 400-metre freestyle at the 2009 World Aquatics Championships, finishing behind Pellegrini but ahead of Adlington. She then went on to claim a bronze medal in the 4×200 m freestyle relay and a silver medal in the 800 m freestyle – the most medals that any British swimmer has ever won in a single world championships.

2012
At the London 2012 Olympics, Jackson finished seventh in her 400 m freestyle heat in a time of 4:11.50 and was also part of the British team that finished in fifth place in the 4×200 m freestyle relay.

Retirement from swimming
After retiring from competitive swimming in 2012, Jackson went on to establish the Joanne Jackson Swim Academy with former Olympic swimmer Grant Turner.

Personal bests and records held

See also
 List of Olympic medalists in swimming (women)
 List of World Aquatics Championships medalists in swimming (women)
 List of Commonwealth Games medallists in swimming (women)
 World record progression 400 metres freestyle

References

External links
 
 JJSA Official website 
 British Olympic Association athlete profile 
 British Swimming athlete profile
 Profile: Joanne Jackson Inspirational Story  olympics30.com

1986 births
Living people
English female swimmers
Olympic swimmers of Great Britain
Commonwealth Games silver medallists for England
Commonwealth Games bronze medallists for England
Swimmers at the 2004 Summer Olympics
Swimmers at the 2006 Commonwealth Games
Swimmers at the 2008 Summer Olympics
Swimmers at the 2010 Commonwealth Games
Swimmers at the 2012 Summer Olympics
Olympic bronze medallists for Great Britain
People from Northallerton
World record setters in swimming
People from Richmond, North Yorkshire
Olympic bronze medalists in swimming
English female freestyle swimmers
World Aquatics Championships medalists in swimming
English Olympic medallists
Medalists at the FINA World Swimming Championships (25 m)
European Aquatics Championships medalists in swimming
Medalists at the 2008 Summer Olympics
Sportspeople from North Yorkshire
Commonwealth Games medallists in swimming
20th-century English women
21st-century English women
Medallists at the 2006 Commonwealth Games
Medallists at the 2010 Commonwealth Games